Benjamin Howell may refer to:

 Benjamin Franklin Howell (1844–1933), U.S. Representative from New Jersey
 Benjamin Hunting Howell (1875–?), American rower